This is a list of notable buildings that have housed traditional gentlemen's clubs or working men's clubs.  These are individual buildings that are listed on a historic register or have other significance.  The focus of this list is on buildings, not on the clubs themselves.

in England
Of 25 gentlemen's clubs in London, many are ensconced in historic, dedicated buildings, including:
Boodle's building at 28 St. James's Street, its home since 1782
Athenaeum Club building at 107 Pall Mall since 1830 or before
Houldsworth Working Men's Club, Manchester, a Grade II listed building
Dial House, Sheffield, location of former Dial House Working Men's Club

in the United States
Many traditional gentlemen's clubs in the United States are situated in notable historic buildings, a number of which are listed on the National Register of Historic Places.

Tallulah Men's Club Building, Tallulah, LA, NRHP-listed
West End Wheelmen's Club, Wilkes-Barre, PA, built 1897, NRHP-listed.
Issaquah Sportsmen's Club, Issaquah, WA, NRHP-listed
Cincinnati Gymnasium and Athletic Club, Cincinnati, Ohio, NRHP-listed
Denver Athletic Club, Denver, CO, NRHP-listed
Elks Athletic Club, Louisville  KY, NRHP-listed
Midwest Athletic Club, Chicago, IL, NRHP-listed
Missouri Athletic Club Building, St. Louis, MO, NRHP-listed
Union Pacific Athletic Club, Laramie, WY, NRHP-listed
Southside Sportsmens Club District, Great River, NY, NRHP-listed

Non NRHP Buildings

The Boston Club, New Orleans, LA, built by noted architect James Gallier

See also
List of Elks buildings
List of Masonic buildings
List of Fraternal Order of Eagles buildings
List of YMCA buildings
List of Grange Hall buildings
List of Hibernian buildings
List of Knights of Columbus buildings
List of Knights of Pythias buildings
List of Odd Fellows buildings
List of women's club buildings

References

+
 
Working men's clubs